Kunnakudi Venkatarama Iyer was a Carnatic musician and film music Director during the 1940s and 50s. He learned Carnatic music from Namakkal Sesha Aiyangar. He is a recipient of Kalaimamani award conferred by the State government of Tamil Nadu.

Some of the film songs composed by him 
Nadaiyalangkaram Kanden - Kubera Kuchela (1943), Raga: Karaharapriya
Selvame Suga Jeevatharam - Kubera Kuchela (1943), Raga: Sama
Ellorum Nallavare.. - Krishna Bakthi (1949)
Kalaimagal Devakumari - Krishna Bakthi (1949)
Poovaiyar Karpin perumai - Krishna Bakthi (1949)
Saarasam Vaseekara Krishna Bakthi (1949)
Vaseekara Kangal - Krishna Bakthi (1949)
Vinnil Parandhu sellum Venpurave - Mangaiyarkarasi (1949)
Paarthaal Pasi theerum Mangaiyarkarasi (1949)

Films he composed music 
 Punjab Kesari (1938)
 Kubera Kuchela (1943)
 Mahamaya (1944)
 Krishna Bakthi (1949)
 Mangaiyarkarasi (1949)
 Penn Manam (1952)

References

Tamil film score composers
Tamil musicians
Carnatic singers
Male Carnatic singers
Indian male film score composers